X Factor is an Italian television music competition to find new singing talent; the winner receives a recording contract with Sony Music. fourteenth season was aired on Sky Uno and TV8 since September 2020. All of the judges from the previous year were replaced; the show seeing the returns of Mika and Manuel Agnelli, and new judges Emma Marrone and Hell Raton. Casadilegon won the competition and Hell Raton became the winning coach for the first time.

Judges' houses

The "Home Visit" is the final phase before the Live Shows. In this phase, the contestants who passed the "Bootcamp" had to perform one last time in front of their specific judge, in four different locations. At the end of this audition, the top twelve contestants were chosen.

The eight eliminated acts were:
Boys: Leo Meconi, Giuseppe Roccuzzo (Roccuzzo)
Girls: Alessandra Ciccariello (Ale), Daria Huber
25+: Gabriel Covino (Kaima), Claudio Luisi (Disarmo)
Groups: Wime, Yellow Monday

Contestants and categories
Key:
 – Winner
 – Runner-up
 – Third place

Live shows

Results summary 
The number of votes received by each act will be released by Sky Italia after the final.

Colour key

Live show details

Week 1 (29 October)

Judges' votes to send through to the final showdown next week
 Agnelli: Eda Marì - backed his own act, Manitoba.
 Mika: Manitoba - backed his own act, Eda Marì.
 Marrone: Eda Marì - gave no reason.
 Raton: Eda Marì - gave no reason.

Week 2 (5 November)

Judges' votes to eliminate (round 1)
 Mika: Santi - backed his own act, Eda Marì.
 Marrone: Eda Marì - backed her own act, Santi.
 Agnelli: Santi - gave no reason.
 Raton: Eda Marì - gave no reason.

With the acts in the sing-off receiving two votes each, the result was deadlocked and a new public vote commenced for 200 seconds. Eda Marì was eliminated as the act with the fewest public votes.

Judges' votes to eliminate (round 2)
 Agnelli: Santi - backed his own act, Manitoba.
 Marrone: Manitoba - backed her own act, Santi.
 Mika: Manitoba - gave no reason.
 Raton: Manitoba - gave no reason.

Week 3 (12 November)

Judges' votes to eliminate
 Agnelli: Blue Phelix - gave no reason.
 Marrone: Santi - gave no reason.
 Mika: Santi - gave no reason.
 Raton: Santi - gave no reason.

Week 4 (19 November)

Judges' votes to eliminate
 Mika: Mydrama - backed his own act, Vergo.
 Raton: Vergo - backed his own act, Mydrama.
 Agnelli: Mydrama - gave no reason.
 Marrone: Vergo - gave no reason.

With the acts in the sing-off receiving two votes each, the result was deadlocked and a new public vote commenced for 200 seconds. Vergo was eliminated as the act with the fewest public votes.

Week 5 (26 November)

Judges' votes to eliminate (round 1)
 Agnelli: N.A.I.P.  - backed his own act, Melancholia.
 Mika: Melancholia  - backed his own act, N.A.I.P.
 Marrone: N.A.I.P. - gave no reason.
 Raton: Melancholia  - gave no reason.

With the acts in the sing-off receiving two votes each, the result was deadlocked and a new public vote commenced for 200 seconds. Melancholia  was eliminated as the act with the fewest public votes.

Judges' votes to eliminate (Round 2)
 Mika: Mydrama - gave no reason.
 Raton: Cmqmartina - gave no reason.
 Agnelli: Cmqmartina - gave no reason.
 Marrone: Cmqmartina - gave no reason.

Week 6: Semi-final (3 December)

Judges' votes to eliminate
 Marrone: Mydrama - backed her own act, Blind.
 Raton: Blind - backed his own act, Mydrama.
 Agnelli: Mydrama - gave no reason.
 Mika: Mydrama - gave no reason.

Week 7: Final (10 December)

References

External links
 X Factor Italia

Italian music television series
Italy 14
X Factor (Italian TV series)
2020 Italian television seasons